Established by the government of Ghana under the FWSC ACT, 2007 (Act 737), the Fair Wages and Salaries Commission has the mandate of implementing the new Government Pay Policy (i.e. Single Spine Pay Policy) as regard salaries, wages, grading and classification of public service workers.

Prior to its establishment, the government of Ghana has had to grapple with the challenge of properly managing salaries and other germane labor concerns of public service workers. A situation that leads to rampant strike actions at the labor front. The Single Spine Salary Structure was thus introduced with the objective of migrating all government workers to a single pay platform for proper administration with the Fair Wages and Salaries Commission given the mandate. As at 2011, available data indicates that the commission has migrated about 98 percent of all government workers unto the Single Spine Salary Structure.

Despite this, the Commission may not have been able to fully live up to its mandate as labor agitations within the public sector continue to rise. To be able to resolve some of these concerns, the commission, in recent  times recommended to government the setting up of an independent emolument commission to streamline salary administration in the country.

Mission 
The Commission exists to ensure that best practices in job grading, evaluation, performance management and research are employed in pay administration to ensure that pay in the Public services is linked to productivity and that high-caliber employees are attracted to and retained within the public service.

Vision 
To become a world class reference center in Pay Administration, promoting Fairness, Equity and Transparency in Public Services Compensation and Benefits.

Some mediated Labour Impasse 

 University Teachers Association of Ghana (UTAG) and Colleges of Education Teachers Association of Ghana (CETAG) strike over better conditions of service
 Civil and Local Government Staff Association of Ghana strike over conditions of service
 Doctors strike over better conditions of service

References

Labour in Ghana